Hespellia is a Gram-positive, strictly anaerobic, non-spore-forming and non-motile genus from the family of Lachnospiraceae.

References

Lachnospiraceae
Bacteria genera